Juneau is a populated place in Indiana County, Pennsylvania, United States.

See also
Canoe Township, Indiana County, Pennsylvania

References

Populated places in Indiana County, Pennsylvania